Diceratostele is a genus of flowering plants from the orchid family, Orchidaceae. At the present time (June 2014), there is only one known species, Diceratostele gabonensis, native to western and central Africa (Gabon, Cameroon, Liberia, Ivory Coast and Congo-Kinshasa).

See also
 List of Orchidaceae genera

References

Pridgeon, A.M., Cribb, P.J., Chase, M.C. & Rasmussen, F.N. (2005). Epidendroideae (Part One). Genera Orchidacearum 4: 606 ff. Oxford University Press
Berg Pana, H. 2005. Handbuch der Orchideen-Namen. Dictionary of Orchid Names. Dizionario dei nomi delle orchidee. Ulmer, Stuttgart

External links

Orchids of Africa
Monotypic Epidendroideae genera
Triphoreae
Triphoreae genera